Lionginas is a Lithuanian masculine given name. People bearing the name Lionginas include:
Lionginas Šepetys (1927–2017), Lithuanian politician
Lionginas Virbalas (born 1961), Lithuanian Roman Catholic prelate, Archbishop of the Roman Catholic Archdiocese of Kaunas

Lithuanian masculine given names